Laserna is a surname. Notable people with the surname include:

Antonio Laserna (1752–1823), Spanish bibliographer and writer
Blas de Laserna (1751–1816), Spanish composer
Mario Laserna Pinzón (1923–2013), Colombian educator and politician 
Paulo Laserna Phillips (born 1953), Colombian journalist, political scientist, television presenter and businessman
Roberto Laserna (born 1953), Bolivian-Spanish writer and economist